Administrative Controlled Substances Code Number (ACSCN) is a number assigned to drugs listed on the schedules created by the US Controlled Substances Act (CSA). The ACSCN is defined in 21 CFR § 1308.03(a).

Each chemical/drug on one of the schedules is assigned an ACSCN (for example, heroin is assigned 9200). The code number is used on various documents used in administration of the system mandated by the CSA.

ACSCN tables include the CSA schedule, common alternative chemical and trade names, and the free base conversion ratio (the molecular mass of the substance in question divided by the molecular mass of the free base). This is used to make meaningful qualitative comparisons between substances, and labeling of the end product may, as is required in many European countries, list the active substance using both (e.g. "each tablet contains 120 mg dihydrocodeine bitartrate, representing 80 mg dihydrocodeine base"). This method of citation is in theory compulsory worldwide for substances in Schedule I of the Single Convention on Narcotic Drugs 1961, a classification corresponding to opioids in US Schedule II with Narcotic classification plus cocaine (which inherited a narcotic designation from the 1931 Convention for Limiting the Manufacture and Regulating the Distribution of Narcotic Drugs and preceding treaties and national laws including the 1914 Harrison Narcotics Tax Act) and German Betäubungsmittelgesetz (BtMG) Schedule I and so on.  This is also the case for Single Convention Schedule IV, which roughly corresponds to the United States' CSA Schedule I. and CSU Schedule

List of schedules
For a complete list, see the list of schedules:

 List of Schedule I drugs (US)
 List of Schedule II drugs (US)
 List of Schedule III drugs (US)
 List of Schedule IV drugs (US)
 List of Schedule V drugs (US)
 List of List 1 reagents and raw materials
 List of List 2 reagents and raw materials

References

Text of Single Convention On Narcotic Drugs 1931 (English). also cited in Wikipedia article on Single Convention, courtesy UNODC web site, retrieved 30. April 2014
21 CFR § 1308.03(a)
DEA Office of Diversion Control WWW site, retrieved 26. April 2014 
German-language text of Österreichische Suchtmittelgesetz, retrieved 3. May 2014 § 27 
German-language text of Deutsche Betäungsmittelgesetz, retrieved 2. May 2014
Innerhalb Betäubungsmittel, IV. Auflage (Wien, 8. February 2002), Tabelle 2C, Seite 116 (Deutsch) / Line 3819 in HTML-Version Copyright © Medical 4. January 1999
2014, CCRPP Press Office Zagreb, Croatia—retrieved 4. January 2014
Office of Narcotics Control & You: The Inside Dope (General Membership Manual of the NCOTCL, First Edition, 21. May 1990
Proceedings for the 8. March 2002 meeting of NCOTCL North American Section
2014 CCRPP Press Office Zagreb, Croatia—retrieved 4. January 2014

Controlled Substances Act